The Under 15 Bayernliga (German: C-Jugend Bayernliga) is the highest level of competition for under 15 football teams in Bavaria and the second tier of the Southern German league system, set below the Under 15 Regionalliga Süd.

History
The competition was established in 1975, as a championship rather than a league, alongside the Bavarian Under 17 championship. Since then, the winner of the competition is determined by an on-off final.

To qualify for the championship, a club had to win one of the seven Bezirksoberligas in Bavaria, the highest football leagues at this level and age.

The seven champions played a quarter final round with home-and-away games, whereby six clubs are drawn against each other for three games. The three winners plus the team that had a bye in this round reach the semi-finals, now played at a neutral ground. The two semi-finals winner enter the Bavarian championship final. Semi-final and final are held on the same weekend and location.

There is no national German championship at this level but an Under 15 Southern German championship exists since 1979, where the regional champions of Bavaria, Württemberg, North Baden, South Baden and Hesse compete.

Below this level, at the under 13 (German: D-Jugend), no Bavarian championship exists. The under 15 level is currently, as of 2008, the highest level of play where clubs like FC Bayern Munich and 1. FC Nürnberg still compete with their first teams at state level.

In 2008, the Bavarian football association had 2,630 registered under 15 teams, a marginal increase from the previous year. All up, 20,699 junior teams were registered with the BFV in 2008

Since 1994, a knock-out cup competition, the Bau Pokal, is also played.

Bayernliga
In 2005, following the example of the under 19 and under 17 Bayernligas, two regional leagues, north and south, were formed. From then on, the two league winners would meet in the Bavarian final. The northern division operates with 14, the southern with 12 clubs. This difference results from the fact that the north has four Bezirksoberligas as the leagues below while the south only has three.

The bottom four clubs in the north and the bottom three clubs in the south are relegated while the seven Bezirksoberliga champions earn direct promotion. In 2008, there were five clubs promoted to the northern division due to SV Memmelsdorf withdrawing at the end of season.

In the 2006–07 season, FC Bayern Munich remained unbeaten throughout the league season, winning the Bavarian final, too, ending the season with 18 wins and five draws.

In the 2007–08 season, Bayern Munich remained unbeaten throughout the league season again, only losing the final to 1. FC Nürnberg. 1. FCN in turn only lost one regular season game, drew one and won all 24 others.

On 24 September 2008, with a 0–1 loss to TSV 1860 Munich in the 2008–09 season's first round, Bayern Munichs unbeaten run of 44 league games came to an end. Previously, the club had lost 0–2 in the league on 10 June 2006 to TSV 1860 Rosenheim in the last round of the 2005–06 season.

Regionalliga
In October 2008, the Southern German football federation decided that, from 2010 onwards, an Under 15 Regionalliga South would be established, a step similar to what had been taken for the under 19 in 1996 and the under 17 in 2000. Regionalligas already exist in the two regions west and north and the south was concerned it would fall behind. After a lengthy debate, 86 of 131 delegates voted for the new league which will include five clubs from Bavaria, alongside clubs from Hesse and Baden-Württemberg. In this vote, the delegates from Baden-Württemberg, where a united Oberliga already exists since 2008, voted against while the other two regions plus the delegates from the professional clubs voted for the proposal.

Geography

Below the  Bayernliga, there is seven Bezirksoberligas, roughly organised within the boundaries of the seven Bavarian Regierungsbezirke, these being:
 Upper Bavaria
 Lower Bavaria
 Upper Palatinate
 Swabia
 Middle Franconia
 Upper Franconia
 Lower Franconia

Champions

Pre–Bayernliga era

Bayernliga era

 Bavarian champions in bold
 Source: Siegerliste der Bayerischen Meisterschaften U15 (C)–Junioren , accessed: 3 February 2011

Winners & Finalists
As of 2019, this is the standings in the all–time winners list:

 ‡ Includes one title won by reserve team.

League placings since 2005–06
The placings in the northern and southern division since 2005–06:

North

South

References

Sources
 Deutschlands Fußball in Zahlen,  An annual publication with tables and results from the Bundesliga to Verbandsliga/Landesliga, publisher: DSFS
 50 Jahre Bayrischer Fussball-Verband  50-year-anniversary book of the Bavarian FA, publisher: Vindelica Verlag, published: 1996

External links 
 Bayrischer Fussball Verband (Bavarian FA)  
 Bavarian League tables and results  

Youth football in Germany
1975 establishments in West Germany
Bayernliga